Ghatkopar is a railway station on the Central Line of the Mumbai Suburban Railway network. It was opened in 1877, and serves the Ghatkopar suburb of Mumbai. About 465,000 commuters use the station daily as of 2014. An average of 35,000 tickets are sold daily.

The western side of Ghatkopar station is connected with the Ghatkopar metro station through a skywalk.

References

Railway stations in India opened in 1877
Mumbai CST-Kalyan rail line
Railway stations in Mumbai Suburban district
Mumbai Suburban Railway stations